Jorge Hine Saborío  (October 6, 1878 – May 16, 1962) was a Costa Rican politician and businessman.

He was born in San Ramón, Costa Rica to Luis Hine Ramírez and Enriqueta Saborío Iglesias. He married Ana María García Bottino, the daughter of Vespancio García Cuervo and Colomba Bottino Capiro, on June 17, 1904 in San José.

He was a businessman of substantial means, and he was the Bank Manager of Costa Rica. He was Vice President of the Republic from May 8, 1936 to May 8, 1944. From March 4 to March 16, 1943, he acted temporarily as president, while President Rafael Ángel Calderón Guardia traveled to Panama.

1878 births
1962 deaths
People from San Ramón, Costa Rica
Vice presidents of Costa Rica